

Pterosaurs

New taxa

See also

 1843

References

1840s in paleontology
Paleontology